Obliterator is a 1988 computer game.

Obliterator may also refer to:

Obliterator (Dune), a type of weapon in Frank Herbert's fictional Dune universe
Obliterators (Transformers), a subgroup of the Decepticons in the fictional Transformers universe